Nostalgia is an album by Art Farmer and Benny Golson's New Jazztet featuring Curtis Fuller, recorded in New York in 1983 and originally released on the Japanese Baystate label in 1984.

Reception

Ken Dryden of Allmusic said "While neither version of the old nor the updated edition of the Jazztet met with commercial success, the various groups co-led by Art Farmer and Benny Golson always produced memorable recordings".

Track listing
All compositions by Benny Golson except where noted
 "Autumn Leaves" (Joseph Kosma, Jacques Prévert, Johnny Mercer) 
 "Jam 'N' Boogie"
 "Caribbean Runabout"
 "Dark Eyes" (Traditional)
 "Red Dragonfly" (Kosaku Yamada)
 "Solstice" (Art Farmer)
 "From Dream to Dream"

Personnel
 Art Farmer - flugelhorn
 Benny Golson - tenor saxophone
 Curtis Fuller - trombone
 Mickey Tucker - piano
 Rufus Reid - bass 
 Billy Hart - drums

References 

Baystate Records albums
Art Farmer albums
Benny Golson albums
1984 albums